Illusions is the first album featuring Brazilian jazz pianist and singer Eliane Elias as a leader. The record was released in 1986 on the Denon label.

Reception
Scott Yanow of Allmusic noted "Eliane Elias' debut as a leader ... finds her abandoning the electric keyboards in favor of acoustic piano. A fine start to a significant solo career."

Track listing

Personnel
Eliane Elias – piano
Stanley Clarke – bass (1,2)
Lenny White – drums (1,2)
Eddie Gómez – bass (3-9)
Al Foster – drums (4-6,8,9)
Steve Gadd – drums (3,7)
Toots Thielemans – harmonica (4,9)

Chart performance
Illusions peaked at #1 Radio & Records in September 1987 on the Contemporary Jazz chart.

References

External links

1986 albums
Eliane Elias albums